"Until You Come Back to Me (That's What I'm Gonna Do)" is a song written by Morris Broadnax, Clarence Paul, and Stevie Wonder. The song was originally recorded by Stevie Wonder in 1967, but his version was not released as a single and did not appear on an album until 1977's anthology Looking Back. The best-known version of this song is the 1973 release by Aretha Franklin, who had a million-selling top 10 hit on Billboard charts. The song reached No. 1 on the R&B chart and No. 3 on the Hot 100 chart in 1974. It became an RIAA Gold record.

With this peak at number three, Franklin became the first artist in the history of the Hot 100 chart to have a hit song peak at each position from one to ten on the chart. To date, only four other artists have achieved this feat: Marvin Gaye in 1983, Madonna in 1996, Drake in 2013, and Taylor Swift in 2015. Aretha's version of the song was ranked by Billboard as the No. 11 song for 1974.

Personnel
Aretha Franklin version
 Aretha Franklin – lead vocals, acoustic piano
 Kenneth Bichel – synthesizer
 Margaret Branch – background vocals
 Ann S. Clark – background vocals
 Donny Hathaway – electric piano
 Hugh McCracken – guitar
 Bernard Purdie – drums
 Chuck Rainey – electric bass
 Pat Smith – background vocals
 Richard Tee – organ 
 Arif Mardin – horn arrangement, string arrangement
 Joe Farrell – flute
 Gene Orloff – concert master

Track listing
7" single
A. "Until You Come Back to Me (That's What I'm Gonna Do)" – 3:25
B. "If You Don't Think" – 3:49

Charts

Weekly charts

Year-end charts

Miki Howard version

Miki Howard recorded the song for her 1989 self-titled album. Her version was an R&B hit in 1990 when it peaked at No. 3 on Billboard's Hot Black Singles chart. Mark Romanek directed the video for Howard's rendition.

Track listings
US 7" vinyl single
A: "Until You Come Back to Me (That's What I'm Gonna Do)" – 4:03
B: "Come Share My Love" – 4:43

US 12" vinyl single
A: "Until You Come Back to Me (That's What I'm Gonna Do)" (Remix 12" Version) – 5:22
B1: "Until You Come Back to Me (That's What I'm Gonna Do)" (LP Version) – 4:00
B2: "Until You Come Back to Me (That's What I'm Gonna Do)" (Remix Dub) – 4:46

UK 12" vinyl single
A: "Until You Come Back to Me (That's What I'm Gonna Do)" (Brixton Bass Mix) – 5:20
B1: "Until You Come Back to Me (That's What I'm Gonna Do)" (LP Version) – 4:00
B2: "Come Share My Love" (LP Version) – 4:43

UK CD single
 "Until You Come Back to Me (That's What I'm Gonna Do)" – 4:05
 "Come Share My Love" – 4:42
 "Until You Come Back to Me (That's What I'm Gonna Do)" (Brixton Bass Mix) – 5:20

Charts

Weekly charts

Year-end charts

Other cover versions
In 1983, Leo Sayer featured a cover on his album Have You Ever Been in Love, and released it as a single, titled "Till You Come Back to Me". It reached no. 51 in the UK.
The song was again covered in 1983 by Luther Vandross who released it on his album Busy Body as part of a medley with "Superstar", as well as its closing track. The medley peaked at no. 87 on the Billboard Hot 100 and no. 5 on the Hot Black Singles chart in 1984.
Basia recorded this song on her 1990 album London Warsaw New York. When released as a single, her version reached no. 33 on Billboard's Adult Contemporary chart. The music video for her cover featured footage shot in Seattle, with scenes including the Alaskan Way Viaduct and the landmark Paramount Theatre. The clip was directed by Nick Morris.

References

1967 songs
Aretha Franklin songs
Atlantic Records singles
Basia songs
Epic Records singles
Leo Sayer songs
Luther Vandross songs
Miki Howard songs
Songs written by Clarence Paul
Songs written by Morris Broadnax
Songs written by Stevie Wonder
Sony Music singles
Stevie Wonder songs
Torch songs
1973 singles